Brandeis University Press is a university press supported by Brandeis University, Massachusetts. The press was originally founded in 1971 as an imprint of the University Press of New England publishing consortium, but following the consortium's disbanding in 2018, Brandeis University Press was relaunched in 2019 as a separate publisher. In 2021, Brandeis University Press secured the rights to the University Press of New England's catalog of past publications.

See also

 List of English-language book publishing companies
 List of university presses

References

External links 
Brandeis University Press

2019 establishments in Massachusetts
Brandeis University
Publishing companies established in 2019
Brandeis University Press